Aurelian Ionuț Chițu (born 25 March 1991) is a Romanian professional footballer who plays as a forward for Liga I club FC U Craiova 1948.

Club career

Viitorul 
In 2009, Chițu signed a contract with then Liga III club, Viitorul Constanța, helping them to promote in second tier, Liga II. In 2011, he help them to promote in the first tier of the Romanian football, Liga I. On 23 June 2012, Chițu made his debut in Liga I in a 2–2 draw with FC Brașov. In his first season in Romanian top division, he made 33 league appearances and scored 8 goals to make sure Viitorul avoid the relegation. On 5 June 2013, Chițu picked up the Digi Sport Young Player of the Year award.

Valenciennes 
On 21 June 2013, he signed a 4-year contract with Valenciennes FC for an undisclosed fee. On 10 August, Chițu made his debut in Ligue 1 in a 3–0 win against Toulouse.

Career statistics

Club

International

Honours
Viitorul Constanța
Liga I: 2016–17
Liga III: 2009–10
Supercupa României runner-up: 2017

Individual
 Digi Sport Young Player of the Year: 2012–13

References

External links

1991 births
People from Țăndărei
Living people
Association football midfielders
Romanian footballers
Romania youth international footballers
Romania under-21 international footballers
Romania international footballers
Liga I players
Liga II players
Liga III players
FC Viitorul Constanța players
FC Astra Giurgiu players
FCV Farul Constanța players
FC U Craiova 1948 players
Ligue 1 players
Valenciennes FC players
Super League Greece players
PAS Giannina F.C. players
Romanian expatriate footballers
Expatriate footballers in France
Romanian expatriate sportspeople in France
Expatriate footballers in Greece
Romanian expatriate sportspeople in Greece
Romanian expatriate sportspeople in South Korea
K League 2 players
Daejeon Hana Citizen FC players